All the Shah's Men: An American Coup and the Roots of Middle East Terror is a book written by American journalist Stephen Kinzer.  The book discusses the 1953 Iranian coup d'état backed by the U.S. Central Intelligence Agency (CIA) in which Mohammed Mossadegh, Iran's democratically elected prime minister, was overthrown by Islamists supported by American and British agents (chief among them Kermit Roosevelt) and royalists loyal to Shah Mohammad Reza Pahlavi.

Summary 
In 1933 Reza Shah signed a deal selling Iranian oil extraction rights to the Anglo-Persian Oil Company, later called British Petroleum (BP). Though Iran was officially neutral at the start of World War II, its monarch was friendly towards the Axis. Following the 1941 Allied Invasion of Iran, Reza Shah was forced to abdicate in favour of his son Mohammad Reza Shah, who upheld the oil agreement with APOC, which by then had been renamed the "Anglo-Iranian Oil Company". When the first democratically elected parliament and prime minister in Iran took power in 1950 they planned to seize the oil assets in Iran that had been developed by the British, violating the still running oil contract with British Petroleum. The British government followed to court in the Hague's International Court, lost the case against Iran's new government and reacted by blockading the Persian Gulf, the Strait of Hormuz, halting Iran's trade and economy. At this point Mohammad Reza Shah escaped Iran and took refugee in the West and the whole power went into hands of the elected government led by Mohammad Mosaddegh.

The US was concerned that Iranian Prime Minister Mohammad Mosaddegh was seeking help from the local superpower, the Soviet Union, against Britain. The Eisenhower administration agreed with British Prime Minister Winston Churchill's government to restore the pro-Western Shah to power. In the summer of 1953, the CIA and Britain's MI6 arranged a coup in Tehran. Mossadegh was successfully overthrown and spent the rest of his life on his country estate under house arrest, and Iran remained a staunch Cold War ally of the West. After more than 20 years of the Shah's rule, there was a bloody revolution in 1979 and brought into power an Islamic republic, which has ruled ever since.

Regarding US policy as it developed towards Iran in the early 1950s, the book portrays it as having been variously driven by the fear of annoying the British, an attempt to be an honest broker, or an  effort to stop the spread of Communism. The fact, stated at the end of the book, that US companies were granted the majority of the oil concessions from the Shah's government after the coup, does not feature significantly in the earlier part of the narrative.

References

External links
 All the Shah's Men at Archive.org  
  Review Essay of Stephen Kinzer's All the Shah's Men, By: Masoud Kazemzadeh, Ph.D.,  MIDDLE EAST POLICY, VOL. XI, NO. 4, WINTER 2004
 How to Overthrow a Government—interview with Stephen Kinzer, author of All the Shah’s Men: An American Coup and the Roots of Middle East Terror
 US-Iranian Relations, the 1953 CIA Coup in Iran and the Roots of Middle East Terror—Interview with Stephen Kinzer, author of All the Shah’s Men
 All The Shah’s Men—interview with Steven Kinzer
 Review of All the Shah's Men by David S. Robarge
 A Very Elegant Coup—critique of All the Shah’s Men
 Presentation by Kinzer on All the Shah's Men, October 8, 2003, C-SPAN

2003 non-fiction books
Books about coups d'état
Non-fiction books about the Central Intelligence Agency
Books about foreign relations of the United States
Books about Mohammad Reza Pahlavi
Books by Stephen Kinzer
Iran–United States relations
Books about politics of Iran